Chelativorans composti is a Gram-negative and thermophilic bacteria from the genus of Chelativorans which has been isolated from compost.

References

External links
Type strain of Chelativorans composti at BacDive -  the Bacterial Diversity Metadatabase

Phyllobacteriaceae
Bacteria described in 2015
Thermophiles